Loft was a German electronic music group who had a number of hit singles in the 1990s, including "Summer Summer", "Hold On", "Love Is Magic", "Don't Stop Me Now", "Mallorca" and "Wake the World".

History 
The brothers Courtney and Richard Williams, who came from Kingston (Jamaica), founded Loft in 1993. The two rappers were supported by singers Lori Glori, Gina Mohammed, Sandra Steinborn, Kim Sanders and Sue (pseudonym: Suzie Electric). The producers of the project were Michael Eisele and Dietmar Stehle (DMP). Loft designated their music as "roots rock reggae".

Their first single was 1993 "Summer Summer" and became a hit in Europe. Their second single "Hold On" featured vocals from Kim Sanders and was a dance hit in Canada. In 1994, the debut album Wake the World was released. The second album, Future World was released in 1995 with vocals provided by Sandra Steinborn and Christiane Eiben. Two more singles were released in 1996, "Mallorca" and "Long John Silver" after which the group decided to take a break.

After five years, the group made a comeback and released the single "Summer Summer (Recall)" in 2003, followed by others.

In november 2019, Loft made a comeback in Mannheim, Germany by performing at the "90's Festival". They announced that singer-songwriter Rosalina Biolan(known as "Rossalina") is their new group member.

Discography

Studio albums

Singles

References

Musical groups from Hamburg
German Eurodance groups